Talbot River is the name of numerous rivers:

In Australia
Talbot River (Western Australia)

In Canada
Talbot River (Ontario)
Talbot River (Quebec)

In New Zealand
Talbot River, New Zealand